A Date With Frosia was a Canadian musical television series which aired on CBC Television in 1954.

Premise
The series featured music performances from such artists as Lois and David Adams, Dorothy Bromley (keyboard), Donna Hossack (harp), National Ballet dancers, female quartet Enchanted Strings and a female quintet

Scheduling
The series aired each Sunday at 7:30 pm (Eastern) as a mid-year replacement for CGE Showtime.

External links
 

CBC Television original programming
1950s Canadian music television series
1954 Canadian television series debuts
1954 Canadian television series endings
Black-and-white Canadian television shows